Sudan Red 7B, also known as Solvent Red 19, Ceres Red 7B, Fat Red 7B, Hexatype carmine B, Lacquer red V3B, Oil violet, Organol bordeaux B, Sudanrot 7B, Typogen carmine, and C.I. 26050, is a red diazo dye. Chemically it is N-ethyl-1-[[p-(phenylazo)phenyl]azo]-2-naphthalenamine. It is soluble in oils and insoluble in water.

It is used in biology for staining, and in industry as one of the fuel dyes. It can be also present in red laser toners.

References

Azo dyes
Staining dyes
Sudan dyes
Fuel dyes